Lauren Bate (born 24 October 1999) is an English racing cyclist.

She rode in the women's team sprint event at the 2018 UCI Track Cycling World Championships and went on to win bronze in the event in 2021. At the 2018 Commonwealth Games, she won bronze in the team sprint event.

Bate became British champion when winning the Sprint Championship at the 2020 British National Track Championships. It was her first individual title having won the team sprint in 2017 and 2018.

References

External links
 

1999 births
Living people
English female cyclists
English track cyclists
People from Billinge, Merseyside
Cyclists at the 2018 Commonwealth Games
Commonwealth Games bronze medallists for England
Commonwealth Games medallists in cycling
Medallists at the 2018 Commonwealth Games